Sarzeh or Sar Zeh may refer to:
 Sarzeh, Bandar Abbas, Hormozgan Province
 Sarzeh, Bashagard, Hormozgan Province
 Sarzeh, Minab, Hormozgan Province
 Sar Zeh, Rudan, Hormozgan Province
 Sarzeh Al-e Mehtarian, Hormozgan Province
 Sarzeh Kharuk, Hormozgan Province
 Sarzeh Posht Band, Hormozgan Province
 Sarzeh Shamil, Hormozgan Province
 Sarzeh-ye Charkan, Hormozgan Province
 Sarzeh, Bardsir, Kerman Province
 Sarzeh, Rigan, Kerman Province
 Sarzeh, Zarand, Kerman Province
 Sarzeh, Iranshahr, Sistan and Baluchestan Province
 Sarzeh, South Khorasan
 Sar Zeh-ye Sofla (disambiguation)